The Air Force Global Logistics Support Center (AFGLSC) served as the hub for supply chain management for the U.S. Air Force.  It was stood down in 2012 as part of Air Force Materiel Command restructuring.

Organization
The AFGLSC consists of three subordinate units.  The 448th Supply Chain Management Wing is based at Tinker Air Force Base and conducts planning and execution of logistics operations.  The 635th Supply Chain Operations Wing is co-located at Scott Air Force Base and supports movement and combat operations.  The 591st Supply Chain Management Group conducts strategic planning and integration from Wright-Patterson Air Force Base.

References

External links
Global support center officially stands up March 28
Permanent Global Logistics Support Centers stands up
Global Logistics Support Center Mission Briefing (March 2008)
Global Logistics Support Center Mission Briefing (July 2008)

See also

Military units and formations in Illinois
Centers of the United States Air Force